Mesonychidae (meaning "middle claws") is an extinct family of small to large-sized omnivorous-carnivorous mammals. They were endemic to North America and Eurasia during the Early Paleocene to the Early Oligocene, and were the earliest group of large carnivorous mammals in Asia. They are not closely related to any living mammals. Mesonychid taxonomy has long been disputed and they have captured popular imagination as "wolves on hooves," animals that combine features of both ungulates and carnivores. Skulls and teeth have similar features to early whales, and the family was long thought to be the ancestors of cetaceans. Recent fossil discoveries have overturned this idea; the consensus is that whales are highly derived artiodactyls. Some researchers now consider the family a sister group either to whales or to artiodactyls, close relatives rather than direct ancestors. Other studies define Mesonychia as basal to all ungulates, occupying a position between Perissodactyla and Ferae. In this case, the resemblances to early whales would be due to convergent evolution among ungulate-like herbivores that developed adaptations related to hunting or eating meat.

Description 
The mesonychids were an unusual group of condylarths with a specialized dentition featuring tri-cuspid upper molars and high-crowned lower molars with shearing surfaces. They had large heads with relatively long necks. Over time, the family evolved foot and leg adaptations for faster running, and jaw adaptations for greater bite force. Like the Paleocene family Arctocyonidae, mesonychids were once viewed as primitive carnivorans, and the diet of most genera probably included meat or fish. Various genera and species coexisted in some locations, as hunters and omnivores or scavengers. In contrast to arctocyonids, the mesonychids had only four digits furnished with hooves supported by narrow fissured end phalanges.

Evolutionary history 
They first appeared in the Early Paleocene, undergoing numerous speciation events during the Paleocene, and Eocene. Mesonychids fared very poorly at the close of the Eocene epoch, with only one genus, Mongolestes, surviving into the Early Oligocene epoch.   
 

Mesonychids probably originated in Asia, where the most primitive mesonychid, Yangtanglestes, is known from the early Paleocene. They were also most diverse in Asia where they occur in all major Paleocene faunas. Since other carnivores such as the creodonts and Carnivora were either rare or absent in these animal communities, mesonychids most likely dominated the large predator niche in the Paleocene of Asia.  Throughout the Paleocene and Eocene, several genera, including Dissacus, Pachyaena and Mesonyx would radiate out from their ancestral home in Asia and into Europe and North America, where they would give rise to new mesonychid genera. These animals would have migrated to North America via the Bering land bridge.

The term "mesonychid" is often used to refer to any of the various members of the order Mesonychia, though most experts prefer to use it to refer to the members of the family Mesonychidae, with many experts using the term "mesonychian" to refer to the order as a whole.

Taxonomy
Mesonychidae was named by Cope (1880). Its type genus is Mesonyx. It was assigned to Creodonta by Cope (1880); to Creodonta by Cope (1889); to Carnivora by Peterson (1919); to Mesonychia by Carroll (1988) and Zhou et al. (1995); and to Cete by Archibald (1998); and to Mesonychia by Carroll (1988), Zhou et al. (1995), Geisler and McKenna (2007) and Spaulding et al. (2009).

Classification
Family Mesonychidae

References

Notes

Cited sources

 
 
 

Rupelian extinctions
Paleocene first appearances
Prehistoric mammal families